Totally Bublé: Original Songs from the Motion Picture Soundtrack Totally Blonde is an EP released by Canadian Jazz performer Michael Bublé. The EP features audio and video sections, containing all seven tracks on the EP in both audio and video format featured in the 2001 comedy Totally Blonde, co-starring Bublé.

The EP was recorded in 2001, before Buble had become a well-known artist, but was not released until 2003 following the success of his self-titled debut album. The EP was later re-released as Michael Bublé Sings Totally Blonde in the United Kingdom in 2008.

Track listing

Chart positions

References

Michael Bublé albums
Comedy film soundtracks
2003 EPs